The 2005 Men's African Volleyball Championship was in Egypt, with 10 teams participating in the continental championship.

Teams

Preliminary round

Group A

Group B

Final round

Final ranking

References
Volleyball Africa Championship 2005 Cairo (EGY)

2005 Men
African championship, Men
Men's African Volleyball Championship
2005 in Egyptian sport
International volleyball competitions hosted by Egypt